Yu Hyeongwon (1622–1673), also spelled as Yoo Hyung-Won, was a Korean philosopher and politician. He was a Neo-Confucianist and science scholar of the Korean Joseon Dynasty. He was Korean pioneer of the early silhak ("practical learning") school as well as an avid social critic and scholar of the late Joseon period. He was the disciple of Misu Heo Mok and second cousin of the silhak scholar Seongho Yi Ik.

Yu hailed from the Munhwa Yu clan, and many of his extended family members held high official positions in the Joseon government.

Works 
Bangyesurock(반계수록 磻溪隧錄) 
Bangyejip(반계집 磻溪集) 
Baekgyungsajam(백경사잠 百警四箴)
Bangyeilgo(반계일고 磻溪一顧) 
Gunhyunje(군현제 郡縣制) 
Yigichongron(이기총론 理氣總論) 
Nanhakmulli(논학물리 論學物理) 
Gyungsulmundap(경설문답 經說問答) 
Jujachanyo(주자찬요 朱子纂要)
Yeojiji(여지지 輿地志) 
Gunhyunjije(군현지제 郡縣之制) 
Gihaengilrok(기행일록 紀行日錄) 
Dongguksaksagangmokjorye(동국사강목조례 東國史綱目條例) 
Donggukyuksagibo(동국역사가고 東國歷史可考) 
Sokgangmokuibo(속강목의보 續綱目疑補) 
Dongsaguiseolbyun(동사괴설변 東史怪說辨) 
Mugyungsaseocho(무경사서초 武經四書抄) 
Gihyosinseojulhyo(기효신서절요 紀效新書節要)
Chungeumjinam(정음지남 正音指南) 
Dojeongchuljip(도정절집 陶靖節集) 
Donggukmuncho(동국문초 東國文抄) 
Jungweowirack(중여위략 中與偉略)

See also
 Yi Sugwang
 Yu Suwon
 Heo Mok
 Yun Hyu
 Yi Seou
 Yi Ik
 Jeong Yakyong

References

Kang, Jae-eun; Lee, Suzanne. (2006) "The land of scholars: two thousand years of Korean Confucianism", Homa & Sekey Books,

Site Link 
 Yu Hyungwon 
 Découvrez la forteresse de Hwaseong entourant le centre de Suwon en Corée du Sud 
 1656 – "Yojiji (輿地志)" by Ryu Hyung-won (柳馨遠) didn't say "Usan is so-called Japanese Matsushima."

1622 births
1673 deaths
17th-century Korean philosophers
Joseon politicians
Korean scholars